The Lake District, also known as the Lakes or Lakeland, is a mountainous region in North West England. A popular holiday destination, it is famous for its lakes, forests, and mountains, and its associations with William Wordsworth and other Lake Poets and also with Beatrix Potter and John Ruskin. It was designated a UNESCO World Heritage Site in 2017.

The Lake District is today completely within Cumbria, and its mountains (or 'fells') are sometimes called the Cumbrian Mountains. Historically it was divided between three English counties (Cumberland, Westmorland and Lancashire), sometimes referred to as the Lakes Counties. The three counties met at the Three Shire Stone on Wrynose Pass in the southern fells west of Ambleside.

It also contains the deepest and largest natural lakes in England, Wast Water and Windermere respectively.

Lake District National Park 

The Lake District National Park includes all of the central Lake District, though the town of Kendal, some coastal areas, and the Lakeland Peninsulas are outside the park boundary.

The area was designated a national park on 9 May 1951. It retained its original boundaries until 2016 when it was extended by 3% in the direction of the Yorkshire Dales National Park to incorporate areas such as land of high landscape value in the Lune Valley.

It is the most visited national park in the United Kingdom with 15.8 million annual visitors and more than 23 million annual day visits, the largest of the thirteen national parks in England and Wales, and the second largest in the UK after the Cairngorms National Park.

Human geography

General 

Settlement 
There are only a handful of major settlements within this mountainous area, the towns of Keswick, Windermere, Ambleside, and Bowness-on-Windermere being the four largest. Significant settlements close to the boundary of the national park include Carlisle, Barrow-in-Furness, Kendal, Ulverston, Dalton-in-Furness, Whitehaven, Workington, Cockermouth, Penrith, Millom and Grange-over-Sands; each of these has important economic links with the area. Other villages are Coniston, Threlkeld, Glenridding, Pooley Bridge, Broughton-in-Furness, Grasmere, Newby Bridge, Staveley, Lindale, Gosforth and Hawkshead. The economies of almost all are intimately linked with tourism. Beyond these are a scattering of hamlets and many isolated farmsteads, some of which are still tied to agriculture; others now function as part of the tourist economy.

Communications

Roads 

The Lake District is very nearly contained within a box of trunk routes and major A roads. It is flanked to the east by the A6 road, which runs from Kendal to Penrith (though the National Park extension approved in 2015 is east of the A6); across its southern fringes by the A590, which connects the M6 to Barrow-in-Furness, and the A5092, and across its northern edge by the A66 trunk road between Penrith and Workington. The A595 (linking the A66 with the A5092) forms the park boundary from Calder Bridge to Holmrook, then crosses the coastal plain of the park until turning inland at the Whicham Valley, forming much of the park boundary again until joining the A5092 at Grizebeck.

Besides these, a few A roads penetrate the area itself, notably the A591 which runs north-westwards from Kendal to Windermere and then on to Keswick. It continues up the east side of Bassenthwaite Lake. "The A591, Grasmere, Lake District" was short-listed in the 2011 Google Street View awards in the Most Romantic Street category. The A593 and A5084 link the Ambleside and Coniston areas with the A590 to the south whilst the A592 and A5074 similarly link Windermere with the A590. The A592 also continues northwards from Windermere to Ullswater and Penrith by way of the Kirkstone Pass.

Some valleys which are not penetrated by A roads are served by B roads. The B5289 serves Lorton Vale and Buttermere and links via the Honister Pass with Borrowdale. The B5292 ascends the Whinlatter Pass from Lorton Vale before dropping down to Braithwaite near Keswick. The B5322 serves the valley of St John's in the Vale whilst Great Langdale is served by the B5343. Other valleys such as Little Langdale, Eskdale and Dunnerdale are served by minor roads. The last of these is connected with the first two by the Wrynose and Hardknott passes respectively; both of these passes are known for their steep gradients and are together one of the most popular climbs in the United Kingdom for cycling enthusiasts. A minor road through the Newlands Valley connects via Newlands Hause with the B5289 at Buttermere. Wasdale is served by a cul-de-sac minor road, as is Longsleddale and the valleys at Haweswater and Kentmere. There are networks of minor roads in the lower-lying southern part of the area, connecting numerous communities between Kendal, Windermere, and Coniston.

Railways and ferries 
The West Coast Main Line skirts the eastern edge of the Lake District and the Cumbrian Coast Line passes through the southern and western fringes of the area. A single railway line, the Windermere Branch Line, penetrates from Kendal to Windermere via Staveley. Railways once served Broughton-in-Furness and Coniston (closed to passengers in 1958) and another ran from Penrith to Cockermouth via Keswick (closed west of Keswick in 1966 and completely in 1972). Part of the track of the latter is used by the improved A66 trunk road.

The Cumbrian Coast line has three stations within the boundaries of the national park (and additionally Drigg, about a third of a mile from the park boundary). The line gives railway enthusiasts and others a flavour of a pre-Beeching railway line, with features like manually operated level crossing gates, as well as giving a good connection to the steam railway into Eskdale and providing access for cyclists and serious walkers to the Western Fells.

The narrow gauge Ravenglass and Eskdale Railway runs from Ravenglass on the west coast up Eskdale as far as Dalegarth Station near the hamlet of Boot, catering for tourists. Another heritage railway, the Lakeside and Haverthwaite Railway, runs between Lake Windermere and Haverthwaite, and tourists can connect at Lakeside with the boats up the lake to Bowness.

A vehicle-carrying cable ferry, the Windermere Ferry, runs frequent services across Windermere. There are also seasonal passenger boats on Coniston Water, Derwent Water, and Ullswater.

Footpaths and bridleways 
There are many paths over which the public has a right of way, all of which should be signposted.
 of public bridleways,
 of restricted byways and
 of byways open to all traffic. There is also a general "right to roam" in open country.

Many of these tracks arose centuries ago and were used either as ridge highways (such as along High Street) or as passes for travelling across the ridges between settlements in the valleys. Historically these paths were not planned for reaching summits, but more recently they are used by fell walkers for that purpose.

Cycling and horse riding are allowed on bridleways, but cyclists must give way to all other users. Motor vehicles are only allowed on "byways open to all traffic" (green lanes) but in practice Traffic Regulation Orders have been brought in on several prohibiting motor traffic, although a system of permits operates on Gatesgarth Pass.

Physical geography 
The Lake District is a roughly circular upland massif, deeply dissected by a broadly radial pattern of major valleys which are largely the result of repeated glaciations over the last 2 million years. The apparent radial pattern is not from a central dome, but from an axial watershed extending from St Bees Head in the west to Shap in the east. Most of these valleys display the U-shaped cross-section characteristic of glacial origin and often contain long narrow lakes in bedrock hollows, with tracts of relatively flat ground at their infilled heads, or where they are divided by lateral tributaries (Buttermere-Crummock Water; Derwent Water-Bassenthwaite Lake). Smaller lakes known as tarns occupy glacial cirques at higher elevations. It is the abundance of both which has led to the area becoming known as the Lake District.

Many of the higher fells are rocky, while moorland predominates lower down. Vegetation cover in better-drained areas includes bracken and heather, though much of the land is boggy, due to the high rainfall. Deciduous native woodland occurs on many of the steeper slopes below the tree line, but with native oak supplemented by extensive conifer plantations in many areas, particularly Grizedale Forest in the generally lower southern part of the area. The Lake District extends to the sea to the west and south.

The highest mountain in England, Scafell Pike (978m/3210'), has a far-reaching view on a clear day, ranging from the Galloway Hills of Scotland, the Mourne Mountains in Northern Ireland, the Isle of Man, and Snowdonia in Wales.

Fells (mountains and hills) 

The mountains (or 'fells') of the Lake District are known as the "Cumbrian Mountains", "Cumbrian Fells" or "Lakeland Fells". The four highest fells exceed . These are:
 Scafell Pike, 
 Scafell, 
 Helvellyn, 
 Skiddaw,

Northern Fells 
The Northern Fells are a clearly defined range of hills contained within a  diameter circle between Keswick in the southwest and Caldbeck in the northeast. They culminate in the  peak of Skiddaw. Other notable peaks are Blencathra (also known as Saddleback) and Carrock Fell. Bassenthwaite Lake occupies the valley between this massif and the North Western Fells.

North Western Fells 
The North Western Fells lie between Borrowdale and Bassenthwaite Lake to the east and Buttermere and Lorton Vale to the west. Their southernmost point is at Honister Pass. This area includes the Derwent Fells above the Newlands Valley and hills to the north amongst which are Dale Head, Robinson. The fells in this area are rounded Skiddaw slate, with few tarns and relatively few rock faces.

Western Fells 

The Western Fells lie between Buttermere and Wasdale, with Sty Head forming the apex of a large triangle. Ennerdale bisects the area, which consists of the High Stile ridge north of Ennerdale, the Loweswater Fells in the far northwest, the Pillar group in the southwest, and Great Gable near Sty Head. Other tops include Seatallan, Haystacks and Kirk Fell. This area is craggy and steep, with the impressive pinnacle of Pillar Rock its showpiece. Wastwater, located in this part, is England's deepest lake.

Central Fells 
They take the form of a ridge running between Derwent Water in the west and Thirlmere in the east, from Keswick in the north to Langdale Pikes in the south. A spur extends southeast to Loughrigg Fell above Ambleside. The central ridge running north over High Seat is exceptionally boggy.

Eastern Fells 

The Eastern Fells consist of a long north-to-south ridge, the Helvellyn range, running from Clough Head to Seat Sandal with the  Helvellyn at its highest point. The western slopes of these summits tend to be grassy, with rocky corries and crags on the eastern side. The Fairfield group lies to the south of the range and forms a similar pattern with towering rock faces and hidden valleys spilling into the Patterdale valley. It culminates in the height of Red Screes overlooking the Kirkstone Pass.

Far Eastern Fells 

The Far Eastern Fells refers to all of the Lakeland fells to the east of Ullswater and the A592 road running south to Windermere. At , the peak known as High Street is the highest point on a complex ridge that runs broadly north-south and overlooks the hidden valley of Haweswater to its east. In the north of this region are the lower fells of Martindale Common and Bampton Common whilst in the south are the fells overlooking the Kentmere valley. Further to the east, beyond Mardale and Longsleddale is Shap Fell, an extensive area consisting of high moorland, more rolling and Pennine in nature than the mountains to the west.

Southern Fells 

The Southern Fells occupy the southwestern quarter of the Lake District. They can be regarded as comprising a northern grouping between Wasdale, Eskdale, and the two Langdale valleys, a southeastern group east of Dunnerdale and south of Little Langdale, and a southwestern group bounded by Eskdale to the north and Dunnerdale to the east.

Though it is slightly lower it has a  rockface, Scafell Crag, on its northern side. It also includes the Wastwater Screes overlooking Wasdale, the Glaramara ridge overlooking Borrowdale, the three tops of Crinkle Crags, Bowfell and Esk Pike. The core of the area is drained by the infant River Esk. Collectively these are some of the Lake District's most rugged hillsides.

The second group, otherwise known as the Furness Fells or Coniston Fells, have as their northern boundary the steep and narrow Hardknott and Wrynose passes. The highest are Old Man of Coniston and Swirl How which slightly exceed .

The third group to the west of the Duddon includes Harter Fell and the long ridge leading over Whitfell to Black Combe and the sea. The south of this region consists of lower forests and knolls, with Kirkby Moor on the southern boundary. The southwestern Lake District ends near the Furness peninsula and Barrow-in-Furness, a town which many Lake District residents rely on for basic amenities.

Southeastern area 
The southeastern area is the territory between Coniston Water and Windermere and east of Windermere towards Kendal and south to Lindale. There are no high summits in this area which are mainly low hills, knolls and limestone cuestas such as Gummer's How and Whitbarrow. Kendal and Morecambe Bay stand at the eastern and southern edges of the area.

Valleys 

The main radial valleys are (clockwise from the south) Dunnerdale, Eskdale, Wasdale, Ennerdale, the Vale of Lorton, and Buttermere valley, the Derwent Valley and Borrowdale, the Ullswater valley, Haweswater valley, Longsleddale, the Kentmere valley, those converging on the head of Windermere - Grasmere, Great Langdale and Little Langdale, and the Coniston Water valley. The valleys break the mountains up into blocks, which have been described by various authors in different ways. The most frequently encountered approach is that made popular by Alfred Wainwright who published seven separate area guides to the Lakeland Fells.

Lakes 

Only one of the lakes in the Lake District is called by that name, Bassenthwaite Lake. All the others such as Windermere, Coniston Water, Ullswater and Buttermere are meres, tarns and waters, with mere being the least common and water being the most common. The major lakes and reservoirs in the National Park are given below.

Bassenthwaite Lake
Brotherswater
Buttermere
Coniston Water
Crummock Water
Derwent Water
Devoke Water
Elter Water
Ennerdale Water
Esthwaite Water
Grasmere
Haweswater Reservoir
Hayeswater
Loweswater
Rydal Water
Thirlmere
Ullswater
Wast Water
Windermere

Woodlands 
Below the tree line are wooded areas, including British and European native oak woodlands and introduced softwood plantations. The woodlands provide habitats for native English wildlife. The native red squirrel is found in the Lake District and a few other parts of England. In parts of the Lake District, the rainfall is higher than in any other part of England. This gives Atlantic mosses, ferns, lichen, and liverworts the chance to grow. There is some ancient woodland in the National Park. Management of the woodlands varies: some are coppiced, some pollarded, some left to grow naturally, and some provide grazing and shelter.

Coast
The Lake District extends to the coast of the Irish Sea from Drigg in the north to Silecroft in the south, encompassing the estuaries of the Esk and its tributaries, the Irt and the Mite. The intertidal zone of the combined estuaries includes sand, shingle and mudflats, and saltmarsh. The dune systems on either side of the estuary are protected as nature reserves; Drigg Dunes and Gullery to the north and Eskmeals Dunes to the south. South of the estuary, the coast is formed in low cliffs of glacial till, sands, and gravels.

The district also extends to the tidal waters of Morecambe Bay and several of its estuaries alongside the Furness and Cartmel Peninsulas, designated on M6 motorway signposts as the "Lake District Peninsulas", and the southern portions of which lie outside the park. These are the Duddon Estuary, the Leven Estuary, and the western banks and tidal flats of the Kent Estuary. These areas are each characterised by sand and mudflats of scenic and wildlife interest. The coast is backed by extensive flats of raised marine deposits left when the relative sea level was higher.

Geology 

The Lake District's geology is very complex but well-studied. A granite batholith beneath the area is responsible for this upland massif, its relatively low density causing the area to be "buoyed up". The granite can be seen at the surface as the Ennerdale, Skiddaw, Carrock Fell, Eskdale, and Shap granites.

Broadly speaking the area can be divided into three bands, divisions which run southwest to the northeast. Generally speaking, the rocks become younger from the northwest to the southeast. The northwestern band is composed of early to mid-Ordovician sedimentary rocks, largely mudstones and siltstones of marine origin. Together they comprise the Skiddaw Group and include the rocks traditionally known as the Skiddaw Slates. Their friability generally leads to mountains with relatively smooth slopes such as Skiddaw itself.

The central band is a mix of volcanic and sedimentary rocks of mid-to-late Ordovician age comprising the lavas and tuffs of the Borrowdale Volcanic Group, erupted as the former Iapetus Ocean was subducted beneath what is now the Scottish border during the Caledonian orogeny. The northern central peaks, such as Great Rigg, were produced by considerable lava flows. These lava eruptions were followed by a series of pyroclastic eruptions which produced a series of calderas, one of which includes present-day Scafell Pike. These pyroclastic rocks give rise to the craggy landscapes typical of the central fells.

The southeastern band comprises the mudstones and wackes of the Windermere Supergroup and which includes (successively) the rocks of the Dent, Stockdale, Tranearth, Coniston, and Kendal groups. These are generally a little less resistant to erosion than the sequence of the rock to the north and underlie much of the lower landscapes around Coniston and Windermere.

Later intrusions have formed individual outcrops of igneous rock in each of these groups.
Around the edges of these Ordovician and Silurian rocks on the northern, eastern, and southern fringes of the area is a semi-continuous outcrop of Carboniferous Limestone seen most spectacularly at places like Whitbarrow Scar and Scout Scar.

Climate 
The Lake District's location on the northwest coast of England, coupled with its mountainous geography, makes it the wettest part of England.

Although the entire region receives above-average rainfall, there is a wide disparity between the amount of rainfall in the western and eastern lakes, as the Lake District experiences relief rainfall. March to June tend to be the driest months, with October to January the wettest, but at low levels, there is relatively little difference between months.

Although sheltered valleys experience gales on an average of only five days a year, the Lake District is generally very windy with the coastal areas having 20 days of gales, and the fell tops around 100 days of gales per year. The maritime climate means that the Lake District experiences relatively moderate temperature variations throughout the year.

The relatively low height of most of the fells means that, while snow is expected during the winter, they can be free of snow at any time of the year. Normally, significant snowfall only occurs between November and April. On average, snow falls on Helvellyn 67 days per year. During the year, valleys typically experience 20 days with snow falling, a further 200 wet days, and 145 dry days. Hill fog is common at any time of year, and the fells average only around 2.5 hours of sunshine per day, increasing to around 4.1 hours per day on the coastal plains.

Wildlife 

The Lake District is home to a great variety of wildlife, because of its varied topography, lakes, and forests. It provides a home for the red squirrel and colonies of sundew and butterwort, two of the few carnivorous plants native to Britain. The Lake District is a major sanctuary for the red squirrel and has the largest population in England (out of the estimated 140,000 red squirrels in the United Kingdom, compared with about 2.5 million grey squirrels).

The Lake District is home to a range of bird species, and the RSPB maintain a reserve in Haweswater. England's last nesting pair of golden eagles was found in the Lake District; the female was last seen in 2004 and the male was last seen in 2015. Following recolonisation attempts, a pair of ospreys nested in the Lake District for the first time in over 150 years near Bassenthwaite Lake during 2001. Ospreys now frequently migrate north from Africa in the spring to nest in the Lake District, and a total of 23 chicks have fledged in the area since 2001. Another raptor that has had recolonisation attempts is the red kite which, as of 2012, has a population of approximately 90 in the dense forest areas near Grizedale and successfully bred in 2014, the first breeding success in Cumbria in over 200 years. Conservationists hope the reintroduction will create a large population in the Lake District and in North West England where red kite numbers are low. Other bird species resident to the Lake District include the buzzard, dipper, peregrine and common raven. Seasonal birds include the ring ouzel and the common redstart.

The lakes of the Lake District support three rare and endangered species of fish. The vendace is found only in Derwent Water and, until 2008, Bassenthwaite Lake. Vendace have struggled in recent years with naturally occurring algae becoming a threat and the lakes gradually getting warmer.
Vendace have been moved to higher lakes on a number of occasions to preserve the species, notably in 2005 and 2011. The Lakes are also home to two other rare species: the schelly, which lives in Brothers Water, Haweswater, Red Tarn and Ullswater, and the Arctic charr, which can be found in Buttermere, Coniston Water, Crummock Water, Ennerdale Water, Haweswater, Loweswater, Thirlmere, Wast Water, and Windermere.

In recent years, important changes have been made to fisheries byelaws covering the northwest region of England, to help protect some of the rarest fish species. In 2002, the Environment Agency introduced a new fisheries byelaw, banning the use of all freshwater fish as live or dead bait in 14 of the lakes in the Lake District: Bassenthwaite Lake, Brothers Water, Buttermere, Coniston Water, Crummock Water, Derwent Water, Ennerdale Water, Haweswater, Loweswater, Red Tarn, Thirlmere, Ullswater, Wast Water, and Windermere. Anglers not complying with the new byelaw can face fines of up to £2,500.

The lakes and waters of the Lake District do not naturally support as many species of fish as other similar habitats in the south of the country and elsewhere in Europe. Some fish that do thrive there are particularly at risk from the introduction of new species. The introduction of non-native fish can lead to the predation of the native fish fauna or competition for food. There is also the risk of disease being introduced, which can further threaten native populations. In some cases, the introduced species can disturb the environment so much that it becomes unsuitable for particular fish. For example, a major problem has been found with ruffe. This non-native fish has now been introduced into several lakes in recent years. It is known that ruffe eats the eggs of vendace, which are particularly vulnerable because of their long incubation period. This means that they are susceptible to predators for up to 120 days. The eggs of other fish, for example roach, are only at risk for as little as three days.

Economy

Agriculture and forestry 

Farming, and in particular sheep farming, has been the major industry in the region since Roman times. The breed most closely associated with the area is the tough Herdwick, with Rough Fell and Swaledale sheep also common. Sheep farming remains important both for the economy of the region and for preserving the landscape which visitors want to see. Features such as dry stone walls, for example, are there as a result of sheep farming. Some land is also used for silage and dairy farming.

The area was badly affected by the outbreak of foot-and-mouth disease across the United Kingdom in 2001. The outbreak started in Surrey in February but had spread to Cumbria by end of March. Thousands of sheep, including the native Herdwicks which graze on the fellsides across the district, were destroyed. In replacing the sheep, one problem to overcome was that many of the lost sheep were heafed, that is, they knew their part of the unfenced fell and did not stray, with this knowledge being passed between generations. With all the sheep lost at once, this knowledge has to be relearnt and some of the fells have had discreet electric fences strung across them for a period of five years, to allow the sheep to "re-heaf". At the time of the outbreak, worries existed about the future of certain species of sheep such as Ryeland and Herdwick in the district, however these fears have been allayed and sheep now occupy the district in abundance.

Forestry has also assumed greater importance over the last century with the establishment of extensive conifer plantations around Whinlatter Pass, in Ennerdale, and at Grizedale Forest among other places. There are extensive plantations of non-native pine trees.

Industry 
With its wealth of rock types and their abundance in the landscape, mining and quarrying have long been significant activities in the Lake District economy. In Neolithic times, the Lake District was a major source of stone axes, examples of which have been found all over Britain. The primary site, on the slopes of the Langdale Pikes, is sometimes described as a "stone axe factory" of the Langdale axe industry. Some of the earliest stone circles in Britain are connected with this industry.

Mining, particularly of copper, lead (often associated with quantities of silver), baryte, graphite, and slate, was historically a major Lakeland industry, mainly from the 16th to 19th centuries. Coppiced woodland was used extensively to provide charcoal for smelting. Some mining still takes place today; for example, slate mining continues at the Honister Mines, at the top of Honister Pass. Abandoned mine workings can be found on fellsides throughout the district. The locally mined graphite led to the development of the pencil industry, especially around Keswick.

In the middle of the 19th century, half the world textile industry's bobbin supply came from the Lake District area. Over the past century, however, tourism has grown rapidly to become the area's primary source of income.

Development of tourism 

Early visitors to the Lake District, who travelled for the education and pleasure of the journey, include Celia Fiennes who in 1698 undertook a journey the length of England, including riding through Kendal and over Kirkstone Pass into Patterdale. Her experiences and impressions were published in her book Great Journey to Newcastle and Cornwall:

As I walked down at this place I was walled on both sides by those inaccessible high rocky barren hills which hang over one’s head in some places and appear very terrible; and from them springs many little currents of water from the sides and clefts which trickle down to some lower part where it runs swiftly over the stones and shelves in the way, which makes a pleasant rush and murmuring noise and like a snowball is increased by each spring trickling down on either side of those hills, and so descends into the bottoms which are a Moorish ground in which in many places the waters stand, and so form some of those Lakes as it did here.

In 1724, Daniel Defoe published the first volume of A Tour Thro' the Whole Island of Great Britain. He commented on Westmorland that it was:

the wildest, most barren and frightful of any that I have passed over in England, or even Wales itself; the west side, which borders on Cumberland, is indeed bounded by a chain of almost unpassable mountains which, in the language of the country, are called fells.

Towards the end of the 18th century, the area was becoming more popular with travellers. This was partly a result of wars in Continental Europe, restricting the possibility of travel there. In 1778 Thomas West produced A Guide to the Lakes, which began the era of modern tourism. West listed "stations", viewpoints where tourists could enjoy the best views of the landscape, being encouraged to appreciate the formal qualities of the landscape and to apply aesthetic values. At some of these stations, buildings were erected to help this process. The remains of Claife Station (on the western shore Windermere below Claife Heights) can be visited today.

William Wordsworth published his Guide to the Lakes in 1810, and by 1835 it had reached its fifth edition, now called A Guide Through the District of the Lakes in the North of England. This book was particularly influential in popularising the region. Wordsworth's favourite valley was Dunnerdale or the Duddon Valley nestling in the southwest of the Lake District.

The railways led to another expansion in tourism. The Kendal and Windermere Railway was the first to penetrate the Lake District, reaching Kendal in 1846 and Windermere in 1847. The line to Coniston opened in 1848 (although until 1857 this was only linked to the national network with ferries between Fleetwood and Barrow-in-Furness); the line from Penrith through Keswick to Cockermouth in 1865; and the line to Lakeside at the foot of Windermere in 1869. The railways, built with traditional industry in mind, brought with them a huge increase in the number of visitors, thus contributing to the growth of the tourism industry. Railway services were supplemented by steamer boats on the major lakes of Ullswater, Windermere, Coniston Water, and Derwent Water.

The growth in tourist numbers continued into the age of the motor car when railways began to be closed or run down. The formation of the Lake District National Park in 1951 recognised the need to protect the Lake District environment from excessive commercial or industrial exploitation, preserving that which visitors come to see, without any restriction on the movement of people into and around the district. The M6 Motorway helped bring traffic to the Lake District, passing up its eastern flank. The narrow roads present a challenge for traffic flow and, since the 1960s, certain areas have been very congested. This problem continues with traffic congestion and parking problems in the small communities. Bowness-on-Windermere addressed the parking issue with a new lot at the edge of the community and by extending an existing car park. The Lake District NP publishes a list and map of car parks within its authority, allowing tourists to plan their visits accordingly. 

Whilst the roads and railways provided easier access to the area, many people were drawn to Lakeland by the publication of the Pictorial Guide to the Lakeland Fells by Alfred Wainwright. First published between 1955 and 1966, these books provided detailed information on 214 fells across the region, with carefully hand-drawn maps and panoramas, and also stories and asides which add to the colour of the area. They are still used by many visitors to the area as guides for walking excursions, with the ultimate goal of bagging the complete list of Wainwrights. The famous guides were revised by Chris Jesty between 2005 and 2009 to reflect changes, mainly in valley access and paths, and are currently being revised by Clive Hutchby, the author of The Wainwright Companion. The first of the revised volumes, Book One: The Eastern Fells, was published in March 2015; the most recent, Book Six: The North Western Fells, was published in April 2019.

Since the early 1960s, the National Park Authority has employed rangers to help cope with increasing tourism and development, the first being John Wyatt, who has since written several guide books. He was joined two years later by a second, and since then the number of rangers has been rising.

The area has also become associated with the writer Beatrix Potter. Several tourists visit to see her family home, with particularly large numbers coming from Japan.

Tourism has now become the park's major industry, with about 12 million visitors each year, mainly from the UK's larger settlements, China, Japan, Spain, Germany, and the US. Windermere Lake Steamers are Cumbria's most popular charging tourist attraction with about 1.35 million paying customers each year, and the local economy is dependent upon tourists. The negative impact of tourism has been seen, however. Soil erosion, caused by walking, is now a significant problem, with millions of pounds being spent to protect overused paths. In 2006, two tourist information centres in the National Park were closed.

Cycling is now popular in the Lake District National Park. A number of long-distance cycle routes go through the Lake District, including coast to coast cycle routes such as the C2C, Hadrian's Cycleway, the Reivers Route and the Walney to Wear route. Several towns have also become hubs for road-cycling holidays and cycle touring, such as Keswick and Ambleside. Mountain bikers use the trails constructed at Whinlatter Forest and Grizedale Forest and also have wilder routes available on bridleways.

Cultural tourism is becoming an increasingly important part of the wider tourist industry. The Lake District's links with a wealth of artists and writers and its strong history of providing summer theatre performances in the old Blue Box of Century Theatre are strong attractions for visiting tourists. The tradition of theatre is carried on by venues such as Theatre by the Lake in Keswick with its summer season of six plays in repertoire, Christmas and Easter productions, and the many literature, film, mountaineering, jazz, and creative arts festivals, such as the Kendal Mountain Festival and the Keswick Mountain Festival. Two museums, The World of Beatrix Potter and Dove Cottage & The Wordsworth Museum, are also important aspects of the region.

Gastronomy 
Excellent mutton and lamb have been produced locally for generations and traditionally formed the basis of the region's many rustic dishes, such as Tatie Pot, a potato-topped mutton casserole. The Traditional Cumberland Sausage is a spiced, unlinked pork sausage with Protected Geographical Status. The Lake District now has a growing reputation for its fine dining although standard pub and cafe fare continues to dominate. There are 5 Michelin Star restaurants within the World Heritage Site boundaries, with a further one less than a mile outside (L'Enclume). Those inside the area are: The Cottage in the Wood, Allium at Askham Hall, Old Stamp House (Ambleside), the Forest Side, and Hrishi, one of the two restaurants at the Gilpin Hotel,
Cumbria has many microbreweries, together with Jennings Brewery they supply a variety of ales to pubs and restaurants throughout the region.

Literature and the arts 

The Lake District has inspired creativity in many fields.

Literature 
The District is intimately associated with English literature of the 18th and 19th centuries. Thomas Gray was the first to bring the region to attention, when he wrote a journal of his Grand Tour in 1769, but it was William Wordsworth whose poems were most famous and influential. Wordsworth's poem "I Wandered Lonely as a Cloud", inspired by the sight of daffodils on the shores of Ullswater, remains one of the most famous in the English language. Out of his long life of eighty years, sixty were spent amid its lakes and mountains, first as a schoolboy at Hawkshead, and afterward living in Grasmere (1799–1813) and Rydal Mount (1813–50). Wordsworth, Coleridge and Southey became known as the Lake Poets.

The poet and his wife are buried in the churchyard of Grasmere; very near to them are the remains of Hartley Coleridge (son of the poet Samuel Taylor Coleridge), who himself lived for many years in Keswick, Ambleside, and Grasmere. Robert Southey, the Poet Laureate and friend of Wordsworth (who would succeed Southey as Laureate in 1843), was a resident of Keswick for forty years (1803–43), and was buried in Crosthwaite churchyard. Samuel Taylor Coleridge lived for some time in Keswick, and also with the Wordsworths at Grasmere.

The Lake District is mentioned in Jane Austen's Pride and Prejudice; Elizabeth Bennet look forward to a holiday there with her aunt and uncle and is "excessively disappointed" upon learning they cannot travel that far.

The opening of Charlotte Turner Smith's novel Ethelinde with its atmospheric description of Grasmere, complete with a Gothic abbey, is supposed to have induced Wordsworth into looking to it as a possible place of residence.

From 1807 to 1815 John Wilson lived at Windermere. Thomas de Quincey spent the greater part of the years 1809 to 1828 at Grasmere, in the first cottage which Wordsworth had inhabited. Ambleside, or its environs, was also the place of residence both of Thomas Arnold, who spent there the vacations of the last ten years of his life, and of Harriet Martineau, who built herself a house there in 1845. At Keswick, Mrs. Lynn Linton (wife of William James Linton) was born, in 1822. Brantwood, a house beside Coniston Water, was the home of John Ruskin during the last years of his life. His assistant W. G. Collingwood the author, artist, and antiquarian lived nearby and wrote Thorstein of the Mere, set in the Norse period.

In addition to these residents or natives of the Lake District, a variety of other poets and writers made visits to the Lake District or were bound by ties of friendship with those already mentioned above. These include Percy Bysshe Shelley, Sir Walter Scott, Nathaniel Hawthorne, Arthur Hugh Clough, Henry Crabb Robinson, "Conversation" Sharp, Thomas Carlyle, John Keats, Lord Tennyson, Matthew Arnold, Felicia Hemans and Gerald Massey.

Although it is unlikely she ever went there, Letitia Elizabeth Landon produced no less than sixteen poems on subjects within the Lake District and its surroundings, all associated with engravings within Fisher's Drawing Room Scrap Books, from 1832 to 1838. Also included there (1834) is Grasmere Lake (A Sketch by a Cockney), a skit on becoming a 'lakes poet'.
 
During the early 20th century, the children's author Beatrix Potter was in residence at Hill Top Farm, setting many of her famous Peter Rabbit books in the Lake District. Her life was made into a biopic film, starring Renée Zellweger and Ewan McGregor. Children's author Arthur Ransome lived in several areas of the Lake District, and set five of his Swallows and Amazons series of books, published between 1930 and 1947, in a fictionalised Lake District setting. So did Geoffrey Trease with his five Black Banner school stories (1949–56), starting with No Boats on Bannermere.

The novelist Sir Hugh Walpole lived at "Brackenburn" on the lower slopes of Catbells overlooking Derwent Water from 1924 until he died in 1941. Whilst living at "Brackenburn" he wrote The Herries Chronicle detailing the history of a fictional Cumbrian family over two centuries. The noted author and poet Norman Nicholson came from the southwest lakes, living and writing about Millom in the 20th century – he was known as the last of the Lake Poets and came close to becoming the Poet Laureate.

Writer and author Melvyn Bragg was brought up in the region and has used it as the setting for some of his work, such as his novel A Time to Dance, which later turned into a television drama.

The Lake District is the setting for the 1977 Richard Adams' novel The Plague Dogs. Adams' knowledge of the area offers the reader a precise view of the natural beauty of the Lake District. The story is based on a fictionalised version of the remote hill farm of Lawson Park, overlooking Coniston Water.

The Lake District has been the setting for crime novels by Reginald Hill, Val McDermid and Martin Edwards. The region is also a recurring theme in Ernest Hemingway's 1926 novella The Torrents of Spring and features prominently in Ian McEwan's Amsterdam, which won the 1998 Booker Prize. The 1996 Eisner Award winning graphic novel The Tale of One Bad Rat, by Bryan Talbot, features a young girl's journey to and subsequent stay in the Lake District. Also set in the District is Sophie Jackson's mystery novel The Woman Died Thrice. It was published in 2016 under Jackson's pen name Evelyn James.

Memoirist and nature writer James Rebanks has published several books about the Lake District, including two acclaimed books that detail his life as a sheep farmer: The Shepherd's Life: A Tale of the Lake District (2015) and English Pastoral: An Inheritance (2020).

Visual arts 

The Lakes have been an inspiration for many notable artists. Two of the most famous artists to depict the region in their work were Alfred Heaton Cooper and William Heaton Cooper.

The German artist Kurt Schwitters visited the Lake District while in exile in Great Britain and moved there permanently in June 1945, remaining there for the rest of his life.

Film director Ken Russell lived in the Keswick/Borrowdale area from 1975 to 2007 and used it in films such as Tommy and Mahler.

The Keswick School of Industrial Art at Keswick was started in 1884 by Canon Rawnsley, a friend of John Ruskin.

The base of contemporary art commissioner and residency base Grizedale Arts since 2007, Lawson Park now hosts artists' residencies, opens to the public on occasion, and has developed a significant garden that includes artworks alongside extensive plantings. Grizedale Arts has produced many internationally significant cultural projects and has proved instrumental in the careers of several Turner Prize-winning artists, making Laure Provoust's winning installation 'Wantee' at Lawson Park, and bringing the exhibition to Coniston's Ruskin Museum in 2013. It also supported the refurbishment of the historic Coniston Institute and developed an Honest Shop there (opening in 2012), an unstaffed shop stocking local crafts and produce.

Musicians 
The English composer Sir Arthur Somervell (1863 – 1937) was born in Windermere.

The 17th track on American singer-songwriter Taylor Swift's eighth studio album, Folklore, released in 2020 as a bonus track available only on physical copies of the album, is titled, "The Lakes", and details Swift's experience living in the Lake District. Swift makes reference to the Lake poet William Wordsworth by name.

Nomenclature 
Several words and phrases are local to the Lake District and are part of the Cumbrian dialect, though many are shared by other northern dialects. These include:

Fell – from Old Norse , brought to England by Viking invaders and close to modern Norwegian  and Swedish  meaning mountain
Howe – place name from the Old Norse haugr meaning hill, knoll, or mound
Tarn – a word that has been taken to mean a small lake situated in a corrie (the local name for which is cove or comb), a local phrase for any small pool of water. The word is derived from the Old Norse, Norwegian and Swedish word tjern/tjärn, meaning small lake.
Yan tan tethera – the name for a system of sheep counting which was traditionally used in the Lake District. Though now rare, it is still used by some and taught in local schools.
Heaf (a variant of heft) – the "home territory" of a flock of sheep

See also

Regions of England

Notes

References

Further reading

Gannon, P. Rock Trails Lakeland: A Hillwalker's Guide to the Geology and Scenery, 2008, Pesda Press, 
Hollingsworth, S. The Geology of the Lake District: a review, Proc. Geologists Assoc., 65 (Part 4) 1954
Moseley, F. Geology of the Lake District, 1978, Yorkshire Geological Society
Lake District Tours, A Collection of Travel Writings and Guide Books in the Romantic Era in 6 vols., edited by Tomoya Oda, Eureka Press, 2008.
Wilson PW and Jarman D (2015): Rock slope failure in the Lake District. In McDougall DA and Evans DJA (eds), The Quaternary of the Lake District - Field Guide. Quaternary Research Association, London, 83–95.

External links 

 

 
Lake groups of the United Kingdom
World Heritage Sites in England
Mountains and hills of England
Mountain ranges of England
Regions of England